In mathematics, an algebraic function field (often abbreviated as function field) of n variables over a field k is a finitely generated field extension K/k which has transcendence degree n over k. Equivalently, an algebraic function field of n variables over k may be defined as a finite field extension of the field K = k(x1,...,xn) of rational functions in n variables over k.

Example
As an example, in the polynomial ring k[X,Y] consider the ideal generated by the irreducible polynomial Y2 − X3 and form the field of fractions of the quotient ring k[X,Y]/(Y2 − X3). We see that the degree of an algebraic function field is not a well-defined notion.

Category structure
The algebraic function fields over k form a category; the morphisms from function field K to L are the ring homomorphisms f : K → L with f(a) = a for all a in k. All these morphisms are injective. If K is a function field over k of n variables, and L is a function field in m variables, and n > m, then there are no morphisms from K to L.

Function fields arising from varieties, curves and Riemann surfaces
The function field of an algebraic variety of dimension n over k is an algebraic function field of n variables over k.
Two varieties are birationally equivalent if and only if their function fields are isomorphic. (But note that non-isomorphic varieties may have the same function field!) Assigning to each variety its function field yields a duality (contravariant equivalence) between the category of varieties over k (with dominant rational maps as morphisms) and the category of algebraic function fields over k.

The case n = 1 (irreducible algebraic curves in the scheme sense) is especially important, since every function field of one variable over k arises as the function field of a uniquely defined regular (i.e. non-singular) projective irreducible algebraic curve over k. In fact, the function field yields a duality between the category of regular projective irreducible algebraic curves (with dominant regular maps as morphisms) and the category of function fields of one variable over k.

The field M(X) of meromorphic functions defined on a connected Riemann surface X is a function field of one variable over the complex numbers C. In fact, M yields a duality (contravariant equivalence) between the category of compact connected Riemann surfaces (with non-constant holomorphic maps as morphisms) and function fields of one variable over C. A similar correspondence exists between compact connected Klein surfaces and function fields in one variable over R.

Number fields and finite fields
The function field analogy states that almost all theorems on number fields have a counterpart on function fields of one variable over a finite field, and these counterparts are frequently easier to prove. (For example, see Analogue for irreducible polynomials over a finite field.) In the context of this analogy, both number fields and function fields over finite fields are usually called "global fields".

The study of function fields over a finite field has applications in cryptography and error correcting codes. For example, the function field of an elliptic curve over a finite field (an important mathematical tool for public key cryptography) is an algebraic function field.

Function fields over the field of rational numbers play also an important role in solving inverse Galois problems.

Field of constants
Given any algebraic function field K over k, we can consider the set of elements of K which are algebraic over k. These elements form a field, known as the field of constants of the algebraic function field.

For instance, C(x) is a function field of one variable over R; its field of constants is C.

Valuations and places
Key tools to study algebraic function fields are absolute values, valuations, places and their completions.

Given an algebraic function field K/k of one variable, we define the notion of a valuation ring of K/k: this is a subring O of K that contains k and is different from k and K, and such that for any x in K we have x ∈ O or x -1 ∈ O. Each such valuation ring is a discrete valuation ring and its maximal ideal is called a place of K/k.

A discrete valuation of K/k is a surjective function v : K → Z∪{∞} such that v(x) = ∞ iff x = 0, v(xy) = v(x) + v(y) and v(x + y) ≥ min(v(x),v(y)) for all x, y ∈ K, and v(a) = 0 for all a ∈ k \ {0}.

There are natural bijective correspondences between the set of valuation rings of K/k, the set of places of K/k, and the set of discrete valuations of K/k. These sets can be given a natural topological structure: the Zariski–Riemann space of K/k.

See also
function field of an algebraic variety
function field (scheme theory)
algebraic function
Drinfeld module

References

Field (mathematics)